"Outnumbered" is a song by Irish singer Dermot Kennedy from his debut studio album Without Fear, serving as the album's ninth track. The song was written by Kennedy alongside Jay Mooncie, Scott Harris and the song's producer Stephen Kozmeniuk. Riggins Recording, Interscope Records and Island Records released the song as the lead single from Without Fear on 14 June 2019.

Background
Kennedy announced the single via his social media the day before its release. When asked about the song, Kennedy said "'Outnumbered' is an attempt to comfort anybody who is feeling overwhelmed. A reminder that beauty can be found no matter how dark the night may seem. I hope it can be a source of reassurance to anyone going through hard times. To know that things will get better and that hard times will become a thing of the past."

Composition
Musically, the song is a folk-pop song with R&B influences. Lyrically the song is about comforting someone who is feeling overwhelmed.

Music video
The song's music video was released 8 July 2019 via YouTube Artist on the Rise. It was directed by Luke Monaghan and filmed in Wicklow, Ireland area and at the Carlisle Grounds. When asked about the music video, Kennedy said "With this video what I wanted to show was a lot of different people in different situations, all reaching some level of comfort within their struggle. That despite whatever hardship they're enduring, they feel some solace knowing that it will pass and that through love and support from the people closest to them, good times will find them again."

Live performances
Kennedy performed the song at the Glastonbury Festival 2019. He also performed it at YouTube Space NYC in August 2019.

Track listing

Personnel
Credits adapted from Tidal.
Stephen Kozmeniuk – production, songwriting, bass guitar, drums, guitar, synthesizer
Dermot Kennedy – songwriting, guitar, organ, vocals
Jay Mooncie – songwriting
Scott Harris – songwriting, guitar
Todd Clark – background vocals
Matt Snell – engineering

Charts

Weekly charts

Year-end charts

Certifications

Release history

References

2019 songs
2019 singles
Dermot Kennedy songs
Songs written by Stephen Kozmeniuk
Interscope Records singles
Island Records singles
Songs written by Scott Harris (songwriter)
Songs written by Dermot Kennedy